Pinconning cheese is an aged semi-hard whole cow's milk, Colby-style cheese named after Pinconning, Michigan. It is made and distributed by Pinconning Cheese Company and Wilson's (Horn) Cheese Shoppe in Pinconning, Michigan.

It is available as cheese curds and in mild or aged many years, to sharpness levels of medium mild, medium sharp, sharp, extra sharp, and super sharp (10 plus years old). Its hardness and texture change, and sharpness increases with aging. Pinconning cheese's flavor and texture are rich, creamy, and open. It is an unusual and different experience from eating traditional Colby cheese. It is often used as a replacement for Cheddar and Colby in dishes such as macaroni and soufflés."

It was developed and first produced by Daniel Horn in 1915 on a farm at the northeast corner of Mount Forest and Mackinaw Roads. 
The product is still based on the original family recipe and made and produced by companies related to the originator.

Pinconning was chosen as the 'Cheese Capital of Michigan' based on Pinconning cheese.

References

External link
Wilson Cheese Shop
Pinconning Cheese Co. & Fudge Shoppe
Pinconning Cheesehouse
Williams Cheese, producer in Linwood, Michigan, south of Pinconning
Carr Valley Cheese, a Wisconsin producer of Pinconning

American cheeses
Cow's-milk cheeses

Cuisine of Michigan